Eddy "Eddy" Sims (born 2 December 1971 in Geelong) is a former professional Australian darts player

Career
Sims began playing in WDF ranked events in 2006, mainly playing in events based in his homeland. He reached the quarter finals of the Pacific Masters in 2006 and 2007 and followed it up by reaching the final of the 2007 Australian Masters where he lost to Simon Whitlock.

Sims made three ranked semi final appearances in 2008, in the Pacific Masters, Malaysian Open and the New Zealand Masters. He had earlier reached the semi finals of the Central Coast Australian Classic, an unranked event. Sims then won the 2008 Australian Masters, defeating Adam Bainbridge 8–1 in the final.

His good performances in 2008 earned Sims automatic qualification for the 2009 BDO World Darts Championship, entering as the number 16 seed. He was drawn with Welshman Robert Hughes in the first round and lost 3–2.

World Championship results

BDO

 2009: Last 32: (lost to Robert Hughes 2–3) (sets)
 2015: Last 40: (lost to Cedric Waegemans 1–3)

Personal life

He is not a full-time professional and works as a Telecommunication Technical Officer.

References

External links
Profile and stats on Darts Database

1971 births
Australian darts players
Living people
British Darts Organisation players
Professional Darts Corporation associate players
Sportspeople from Geelong
People from Melbourne